Viktoria Vladimirovna Kamenskaya (born 26 November 1991) is a Russian former tennis player.

She has career-high WTA rankings of 182 in singles, achieved on 17 July 2017, and 648 in doubles, reached on 25 October 2010. Kamenskaya won eight singles titles and three doubles titles on tournaments of the ITF Women's Circuit.

On the ITF Junior Circuit, she had a career-high combined ranking of 14, achieved in October 2008. She reached the quarterfinals of both the 2009 Australian Open girls' doubles events.

Kamenskaya made her WTA Tour main-draw debut at the 2017 İstanbul Cup, going through the qualifying.

ITF finals

Singles (8–4)

Doubles (3–0)

External links
 
 

1991 births
Living people
Russian female tennis players
Tennis players from Moscow
20th-century Russian women
21st-century Russian women